Professor Philip MacDonald Sheppard, F.R.S. (27 July 1921 – 17 October 1976) was a British geneticist and lepidopterist. He made advances in ecological and population genetics in lepidopterans, pulmonate land snails and humans. In medical genetics, he worked with Sir Cyril Clarke on Rh disease.

He was born on 27 July 1921 in Marlborough, Wiltshire, England and attended Marlborough College from 1935 to 1939.

1940 to 1945 - Royal Air Force Volunteer Reserve (prisoner-of-war from 1942 to 1945). Participated, as an earth-bearer, in one of the famous tunnel escapes; it is unclear whether this was the "Wooden Horse" escape, or the "Great" Escape
1946 to 1948 - Studied Zoology at Worcester College, University of Oxford.
1956 to 1959 - Lecturer at Liverpool University
1959 to 1962 - Reader at Liverpool University
1963 to 1976 - Professor of genetics at Liverpool University
18 March 1965 - FRS
1974 - Darwin Medal of the Royal Society
1975 - Linnean Medal (Gold Medal) for Zoology from the Linnean Society of London

Cyril Clarke answered an advert in an insect magazine for swallowtail butterfly pupa that had been placed by Sheppard. They met and began working together in their common interest of lepidopterology.  They also worked on Rh disease.

In 1961 Sheppard started a colony of scarlet tiger moths by the Wirral Way, West Kirby, Merseyside, which were rediscovered in 1988 by Cyril Clarke, who continued to observe them in his retirement to study changes in the moth population.

Sheppard married Patricia Beatrice Lee in 1948.  They had three sons. He died of acute leukemia on 17 October 1976.

References

Sheppard P.M. 1958. Natural Selection and Heredity. London: Hutchinson. last ed 1975.
Dictionary of Scientific Biography vol 17, supplement 2 pp 814–816 by J.R.G. Turner.
Biographical Memoires of Fellows of the Royal Society 1977 vol 23 pp 465–500, plate, by Sir Cyril Clarke.
Obituary Professor Philip M. Sheppard, D Phil, FRS (1921-1976) by J.R.G. Turner. Journal of the Lepidopterists' Society vol 31, no.3, pp. 205–212 (1977) [includes list of publications]
Biography and list of papers

1921 births
1976 deaths
People from Marlborough, Wiltshire
People educated at Marlborough College
Fellows of the Royal Society
Alumni of Worcester College, Oxford
British evolutionary biologists
English geneticists
Academics of the University of Liverpool
English lepidopterists
Deaths from leukemia
Royal Air Force personnel of World War II
World War II prisoners of war held by Germany
Linnean Medallists
20th-century British zoologists